Shahid Hafeez Kardar is a Pakistani economist and former provincial finance minister. He served as the 16th Governor of the State Bank of Pakistan from September 2010 to July 2011.

He was the acting Punjab Minister for Finance, Planning & Development, Excise and Taxation and Industries & Minerals Development from November 1999 to January 2001.

He is currently the Vice-Chancellor of Beaconhouse National University in Lahore.

Early life and education
Kardar is the son of former Pakistani Test cricket captain Abdul Hafeez Kardar and belongs to an Arain family of Lahore. He holds an accounting qualification from England and is a graduate of the University of Oxford. His son, Hamza, is married to cricket commentator and sports presenter Zainab Abbas.

References

Living people
1952 births
Pakistani economists
Governors of the State Bank of Pakistan
Alumni of the University of Oxford
Provincial ministers of Punjab
Punjabi people
Vice-Chancellors of universities in Pakistan